The Fatherland Defense Force ( or TAR) or Kampfgruppe Mäder was a short-lived military unit hastily formed in northwestern Lithuania towards the end of World War II to combat approaching Soviet forces. Formed from local Lithuanians, the unit was directly subordinate to the Wehrmacht. Their German commander was Hellmuth Mäder who was hoping to raise a division. However, only two ill-equipped and ill-trained regiments were actually formed. The total membership is estimated at 6,000 men. TAR suffered heavy losses and retreated towards Klaipėda (Memel). In East Prussia, the remaining men were reassigned to various pioneer units.

Formation
As a result of the Operation Bagration, Soviet 1st Baltic Front reached eastern borders of Lithuania in summer 1944 and continued to push forward during the Baltic Offensive. In occupied territories, young men were forcibly mobilized into the Red Army. Lithuanians, having suffered the repressive Soviet occupation in 1940–41, began evacuating towards the west and forming armed groups in Samogitia. The former option won by a narrow margin of votes and these improvised units were organized into TAR, commanded by Captain Izidorius Jatulis. The Lithuanians established contacts with Hellmuth Mäder, an officer in the 9th Army, via priest Jonas Steponavičius. Mäder agreed to support the new unit and provide it with weapons and uniforms.

Organisation 
The 1st Lithuanian Volunteer Regiment, commanded by Major Alfonsas Urbonas, was formed during August 1944. On August 26, it had two battalions and about 1,200 men, but only 47 officers. The 2nd Lithuanian Volunteer Regiment, commanded by Lieutenant-Colonel Mečys Kareiva, was formed during September 1944. There were plans for the 3rd Regiment that would have included the remaining Lithuanian Auxiliary Police Battalions and elevated TAR to the status of a division, but they were not realized. In total, TAR had about 6,000 men. Majority of the men were enthusiastic but inexperienced 18- to 20-year-olds, including 17-year-old Valdas Adamkus, future President of Lithuania.

TAR sorely lacked experienced officers: there were only 112 officers and even fewer had relevant combat experience. Five generals were present in the area and were asked to join TAR. One, Kazys Navakas, accepted but only as the head of the Provisions and Finance Department. Povilas Plechavičius, just released from his arrest due to his command of the Lithuanian Territorial Defense Force, accepted the invitation on a condition that Germans would grant him full authority over TAR. The Germans never replied and Plechavičius never joined TAR. Three other generals refused as they considered the effort to be futile and a waste of men's lives.

TAR also lacked weapons, radios, and other provisions.

Activities

From the first days, the men were involved in strengthening and guarding the front line along the Venta River. The period of August–September was a relatively quiet period as part of the Soviet Army was attacking towards Riga while the other was regrouping and reorganizing in preparation for the offensive towards Klaipėda (Memel). From July 18 to September 19, TAR published five issues of its own newspaper Lietuvos Gynėjas (Defender of Lithuania). TAR also established a relief fund to provide aid to war refugees, firstly to family members of TAR soldiers.

On October 5, 1944, Soviet 1st Baltic Front began the Memel Offensive. The main strategic goal of the offensive was to separate German armies and create the Courland Pocket. The Lithuanians were tasked with defending the towns of Seda (1st Regiment) and Barstyčiai (2nd Regiment). Despite promises, Lithuanians were not reinforced by German troops. The 1st Regiment was commanded by Major Pranas Puodžiūnas, former commander of the 4th police battalion, and Lieutenant Liudas Norkus, who also had experience in the Eastern Front. Germans intended to sacrifice the unit so that main German forces could regroup.

Lithuanians, armed with Panzerfausts, managed to destroy eight Soviet tanks T-34 but quickly ran out of ammunition and were forced to retreat. The regiment lost about 100 men, most of them during the retreat, particularly across Varduva. About 30 were taken captive by the Soviets. Order 193, signed by Stalin on October 8, mentioned Seda as a point of strong resistance and ordered to award most distinguished Soviet fighters.

The remaining men retreated to Barstyčiai where TAR unsuccessfully attempted to regroup. Facing further attacks form the Soviets, TAR retreated towards Kretinga and Klaipėda. The men faced a difficult choice – retreat west with the Germans or return home and join underground resistance that would become the Lithuanian partisans. Perhaps as much as half of the men joined the partisans. About 1,000 men reached East Prussia where they were organized into eight pioneer companies and used them to construct military defenses near Gdańsk, Łomża, Lübeck.

Evaluation
Overall, TAR is a rather obscure and poorly researched event in the history of Lithuania. One of the issues is lack of archival data. Archives of the 1st Regiment were saved by Captain Jonas Čėsna, who after the war immigrated to the United States. After the restoration of the independence, the archive was transferred to Vladas Kazlauskas, a former member of TAR who wrote several books on the topic. However, these writings are disorganized and self-contradictory. The archives still await attention from scholars. Archives of the 2nd Regiment did not survive; therefore, very little is known about its structure or activities.

The unit was organized by Lithuanian initiative when German forces were becoming more and more disorganized. Unlike the Lithuanian Territorial Defense Force, which shared the same goals, TAR was not controlled by the Germans. For example, the oath, which had to be signed by each TAR recruit, mentioned only defending the fatherland and combating Bolshevism making no mention of Nazi Germany. Lithuanian historians consider TAR as one of the attempts to reestablish the Lithuanian Army and fight for Lithuania's independence.

References

Military units and formations established in 1944
Military units and formations disestablished in 1944
Military history of Lithuania during World War II
Lithuanian collaboration with Nazi Germany
Anti-communism in Lithuania
Foreign volunteer units of the Wehrmacht
Generalbezirk Litauen